Toomas Napa (born 5 December 1953) is an Estonian racing driver. In 2001 he was chosen to best motorsport personnel of 20th-century of Estonia.

He was born in Tartu.

He began his racing career in 1968, when he joined a kart racing group. In 1987 he won Cup of Peace and Friendship. He is 9-times Soviet Union champion in different formula disciplines. He is also 2-times Estonian champion.

Awards:
 2001: best motorsport personnel of 20th century of Estonia
 2021: chosen to Hall of Fame of Estonian motorsport celebrities

References

Living people
1953 births
Estonian racing drivers
Sportspeople from Tartu